Stock car racing is a form of automobile racing run on oval tracks and road courses measuring approximately . It originally used production-model cars, hence the name “stock car”, but is now run using cars specifically built for racing. It originated in the southern United States; its largest governing body is NASCAR. Its NASCAR Cup Series is the premier top-level series of professional stock car racing. Australia, Canada, New Zealand, Mexico, Brazil and the United Kingdom also have forms of stock car racing.

Top-level stock cars exceed  at speedway tracks and on superspeedway tracks such as Daytona International Speedway and Talladega Superspeedway.
Contemporary NASCAR-spec top-level cars produce maximum power outputs of 860–900 hp from their naturally aspirated V8 engines. For the 2015 NASCAR Cup Series, power output of the competing cars ranged from 750 to 800 hp (560 to 600 kW).

History

Early years
In the 1920s, moonshine runners during the Prohibition era would often have to outrun the authorities. To do so, they had to upgrade their vehicles—while leaving them looking ordinary, so as not to attract attention.  Eventually, runners started getting together with fellow runners and making runs together. They would challenge one another and eventually progressed to organized events in the early 1930s. The main problem racing faced was the lack of a unified set of rules among the different tracks. When Bill France Sr. saw this problem, he set up a meeting at the Streamline Hotel in order to form an organization that would unify the rules.

When NASCAR was first formed by France in 1948 to regulate stock car racing in the U.S., there was a requirement that any car entered be made entirely of parts available to the general public through automobile dealers.  Additionally, the cars had to be models that had sold more than 500 units to the public. This is referred to as "homologation." In NASCAR's early years, the cars were so "stock" that it was commonplace for the drivers to drive themselves to the competitions in the car that they were going to run in the race. While automobile engine technology had remained fairly stagnant in World War II, advanced aircraft piston engine development had provided a great deal of available data, and NASCAR was formed just as some of the improved technology was about to become available in production cars. Until the advent of the Trans-Am Series in 1967, NASCAR homologation cars were the closest thing that the public could buy that was actually very similar to the cars that were winning national races.

The Oldsmobile was an immediate success in 1949 and 1950, and all the automobile manufacturers could not help noticing the higher sales of the Oldsmobile 88 to the buying public. The motto of the day became "win on Sunday, sell on Monday." However, in spite of the fact that several competing engines were more advanced, the aerodynamic and low-slung Hudson Hornet managed to win in 1951, 1952, and 1953 with a  inline six-cylinder that used an old-style flathead engine, proving there was more to winning than just a more powerful engine.

At the time, it typically took three years for a new design of car body or engine to end up in production and be available for NASCAR racing. Most cars sold to the public did not have a wide variety of engine choices, and the majority of the buying public at the time was not interested in the large displacement special edition engine options that would soon become popular. However, the end of the Korean War in 1953 started an economic boom, and then car buyers immediately began demanding more powerful engines.

Also in 1953, NASCAR recommended that the drivers add roll bars, but did not require them.

In 1955, Chrysler produced the C-300 with its Chrysler FirePower engine   OHV engine, which easily won in 1955 and 1956.

In 1957, several notable events happened. The Automobile Manufacturers Association banned manufacturers from using race wins in their advertising and giving direct support to race teams, as they felt it led to reckless street racing. This forced manufacturers to become creative in producing race parts to help racers win. Race teams were often caught trying to use factory produced racing parts that were not really available to the public, though many parts passed muster by being labeled as heavy-duty "police" parts. Car manufacturers wanted to appear compliant with the ban, but they also wanted to win.

The NASCAR tracks at the time were mainly dirt tracks with modest barriers, and during the 1957 season, a Mercury Monterey crashed into the crowd. This killed many spectators, and resulted in a serious overhaul of the safety rules, which in turn prompted the building of larger, more modern tracks. Also in 1957, Chevrolet sold enough of their new fuel injected engines to the public in order to make them available for racing (and Ford began selling superchargers as an option), but Bill France immediately banned fuel injection and superchargers from NASCAR before they could race. However, even without official factory support or the use of fuel injection, Buck Baker won in 1957 driving a small-block V-8 Chevrolet Bel Air.

In 1961, Ford introduced the F1 390 in a low drag Galaxie "Starliner", but 1960 and '61 championships were won by drivers in 409-powered Chevrolet Impalas.

Pontiac introduced their "Super Duty" 421 in Catalinas that made use of many aluminum body parts to save weight, and the Pontiacs easily won in 1962.

Heyday
The desire from fans and manufacturers alike for higher performance cars within the restrictions of homologation meant that carmakers began producing limited production "special edition" cars based on high production base models. It also became apparent that manufacturers were willing to produce increasingly larger engines to remain competitive (Ford had developed a 483 they hoped to race). For the 1963 season NASCAR engines were restricted to using a maximum displacement of 7.0 liters (427 cu.in.) and using only two valves per cylinder.

Also, even with heavy duty special editions sold to the public for homologation purposes, the race car rules were further modified, primarily in the interest of safety. This is because race drivers and their cars during this era were subjected to forces unheard of in street use, and require a far higher level of protection than is normally afforded by truly "stock" automobile bodies.

In 1963 Ford sold enough of their aerodynamic "sport-roof" edition Galaxies to the public so it would qualify as stock, and with the heavy-duty FE block bored and stroked to the new limit of 427, the top five finishers were all Fords. Chrysler had bored their 413 to create the "Max Wedge" 426, but it still could not compete with the Fords. General Motors' headquarters had genuinely tried to adhere to the 1957 ban, but their Chevrolet division had also constantly tried to work around it, because the other manufacturers had openly circumvented the ban. In 1963 GM gave in and openly abandoned compliance, and Chevrolet was allowed to produce the ZO6 427, but it did not immediately enjoy success.

Then, in 1964 the new Chrysler 426 Hemi engine so dominated the series in a Plymouth Belvedere "Sport Fury", the homologation rules were changed so that 1,000 of any engine and car had to be sold to the public to qualify as a stock part, instead of just 500. This made the 426 Hemi unavailable for the 1965 season.

In 1965 Ford adapted two single-overhead-cams to their FE 427 V8 to allow it to run at a higher RPM (called the Ford 427 Cammer). Ford started to sell "cammers" to the public to homologate it (mostly to dealer-sponsored privateer drag racers), but NASCAR changed the rules to specify that all NASCAR engines must use a single cam-in-block. But even without the cammer, the Ford FE 427 won in 1965.

In 1966 Chrysler sold enough of the 426 Hemis to make it available again, and they put it in their new Dodge Charger which had a low-drag rear window that was radically sloped. It was called a "fast-back", and because of this David Pearson was the series champion that year with Richard Petty dominating 1967, winning 27 of 48 races (including 10 in a row) in the boxier Plymouth Belvedere.

The 1969 season featured the Torino Cobra or Torino "Talladega" which had enough aerodynamic body improvements that it gave it a higher speed than the 1968 Torino, with no other changes. The Cobra, featuring extended nose and reshaped rockers, was renamed Talladega part way through the 1969 season when the Boss 429 replaced the 427. Starting in 1963 up till this point, Ford had won six straight Manufacturer Championships, and by the end of the 1969 season Ford would make it seven in a row. Richard Petty was tired of winning races but losing the championship, so after a private viewing of Ford's new Talladega and Boss 429 engine, he signed a lucrative deal with Ford.

When the race started Donnie Allison's Torino lead the majority of the race (84 laps). Towards the end of the race the Torino of LeeRoy Yarbrough chased down the Dodge of Charlie Glotzbach, who had an 11-second lead. It was the first Daytona 500 won on a last lap pass. Things got worse for Dodge when NASCAR, a few months later, finally allowed Ford to run its hemi-headed Boss 429 engine.

With Ford winning the majority of the races, Dodge was forced to develop a better car of their own. Using the Charger 500 as a basis, they added a pointed nose. This nose was almost a carbon copy of the nose on the 1962 Ford Mustang I prototype. They named it the Dodge Daytona after the race they hoped to win. Even though it never won a Daytona 500 race, it was still a significant improvement over its predecessor the Dodge Charger 500.

NASCAR feared that these increasing speeds significantly surpassed the abilities of the tire technology of the day, and it would undoubtedly increase the number of gruesome wrecks that were occurring. As a result, the 1970 Homologation rules were changed so that one car for every two U.S. dealers had to be built for sale to the public to qualify, hoping to delay the use of aero-bodies until tires could improve.

For the 1970 season Dodge raced the 1969 model Daytona, but Plymouth managed to build over 1,920 Plymouth Superbirds, which were similarly equipped to the Daytona. Petty came back to Plymouth in the plus  Superbird, and Bobby Isaac won the season championship in a Daytona. Almost all teams switched to non-aero bodystyles. NASCAR eventually adopted a restrictor plate to limit top speeds for the 7.0L engine as teams switched to small-block  engines.

Fans, drivers, and manufacturers alike demanded a complete revamping of the rules. NASCAR responded in a way that they hoped would make the cars safer and more equal, so the race series would be more a test of the drivers, rather than a test of car technology.

The era drew to a conclusion in the 1970s.  1972 brought so many rule changes, it has prompted many to consider this year as the start of the modern era of NASCAR racing. In addition, R.J. Reynolds (the tobacco conglomerate) took over as the major sponsor of NASCAR racing (changing the name to the "Winston Cup") and they made a significantly larger financial contribution than previous sponsors. Richard Petty's personal sponsorship with STP also set new, higher standards for financial rewards to driving teams. The sudden infusion of noticeably larger amounts of money changed the entire nature of the sport.

The 1973 oil crisis meant that large displacement special edition homologation cars of all makes were suddenly sitting unsold. Through the balance of the 1970s until 1992, the factory stock sheetmetal over a racing frame meant the cars looked very much like their street version counterparts.  It can be said that 1993, with the addition of ground effect wrap-around type spoilers, marked the beginning for non-stock sheetmetal and from that point forward, stock cars were quickly allowed to differ greatly from anything available to the public. Modern racing "stock" cars are stock in name only, using a body template that is vaguely modeled after currently available automobiles. The chassis, running gear, and other equipment have almost nothing to do with anything in ordinary automobiles.  NASCAR and the auto manufacturers have become aware of this, and for 2013 each brand (Chevrolet, Dodge, Ford, and Toyota) have redesigned their racing sheetmetal to more resemble the street models of their cars.

Types of cars 

A stock car, in the original sense of the term, is an automobile that has not been modified from its original factory configuration. Later the term stock car came to mean any production-based automobile used in racing.  This term is used to differentiate such a car from a "race car", a special, custom-built car designed only for racing purposes.

The degree to which the cars conform to standard model specs has changed over the years and varies from country to country. Today most American stock cars may superficially resemble standard American family sedans but are in fact silhouette cars: purpose-built racing machines built to a strict set of regulations governing the car design ensuring that the chassis, suspension, engine, etc. are architecturally identical to those in stock production vehicles. For example, NASCAR Cup Series race vehicles now require fuel injection.  In the UK and New Zealand there is a racing formula called stock cars, but the cars are markedly different from any road car. In Australia there was a formula that was quite similar to NASCAR called AUSCAR.

The Racecar-Euro Series began in 2009 and was sanctioned by NASCAR as a touring series in 2012, currently operating as the NASCAR Whelen Euro Series.

Street stock and pure stock

"True" stock car racing, which consists of only street vehicles that can be bought by the general public, is sometimes now called "street stock", "pure stock", "hobby stock", "showroom stock", or "U-car" racing. In 1972, SCCA started its first showroom stock racing series, with a price ceiling on the cars of $3,000. Some modern showroom stock racing allows safety modifications done on showroom stock cars.

Super stock
Super stock classes are similar to street stock, but allow for more modifications to the engine. Power output is usually in the range of 500–550 horsepower (373–410 kilowatts).

Some entry level classes are called "street stock", and are similar to what is often called "banger racing" in England.

Modifieds

Modified stock cars resemble a hybrid of open wheel cars and stock cars. The rear wheels are covered by fenders but the front wheels and engine are left exposed. First popular in the United States after World War II, this type of racing was early-on characterized by its participants' modification of passenger cars in pursuit of higher speeds, hence the name. In many regions, particularly on the east coast, modified racing is considered the highest class of stock cars in local racing.

Late models

In many areas of the country Late models are usually the highest class of stock cars in local racing.  Rules for construction of a late model car vary from region to region and even race track to race track. The most common variations (on paved tracks) include super late models (SLMs), late model stock cars (LMSCs), and limited late models (LLMs). A late model may be a custom built machine, or a heavily modified streetcar. Individual sanctioning bodies (like NASCAR, ACT, PASS, UARA, CRA, etc.) maintain their own late model rule books, and even individual racetracks can maintain their own rule books, meaning a late model that is legal in one series or at one track may not be legal at another without modifications. The national touring series, the NASCAR Late Model Sportsman Division, originated from local late model races in the east coast of the U.S. This division was later called the "Busch Series", the "Nationwide Series", and currently the "Xfinity Series" as its title sponsor changed.

United States

NASCAR
NASCAR is currently the largest stock car racing governing body in the world. While NASCAR sanctions multiple series, it has three national championship touring series that are commonly referred to as the "top 3" series. In addition to the top three series, NASCAR also sanctions many regional and local series. NASCAR also sanctions three international series that race in Canada, Mexico, and Europe.

NASCAR Cup Series

The most prominent championship in stock car racing is the NASCAR Cup Series. It is the most popular racing series in the United States, drawing over 6 million spectators in 1997, an average live audience of over 190,000 people for each race.

The most famous event in the series is the Daytona 500, an annual  race at the Daytona International Speedway. The series' second-biggest event is arguably The Brickyard 400, an annual  race held at the Indianapolis Motor Speedway, the legendary home of the Indianapolis 500, an open-wheeled race. However, the event was excluded from the 2021 schedule in favor of a race on the track's road course. Together the Cup Series and Xfinity Series drew 8 million spectators in 1997, compared to 4 million for both American open-wheel series (CART and IRL), which merged in 2008 under the IRL banner. In 2002, 17 of the 20 US top sporting events in terms of attendance were stock car races. Only football drew more television viewers that year.

NASCAR Xfinity Series

The NASCAR Xfinity Series is the second tier series in the United States. It serves as the primary feeder series to the Cup Series, similar to Formula Two for Formula One, and Indy Lights for Indy Car. Races are commonly held as a support race to Cup Series events. Many current Cup Series drivers formerly competed in the Series before moving on to competing full-time in the Cup Series.

The Xfinity series typically features multiple Cup Series competitors competing alongside full time Xfinity drivers. There was some controversy as Cup Series drivers tended to be more successful than full-time Xfinity drivers. Cup drivers aren't eligible to score points in the Xfinity series, and are limited to the number of races they are allowed to race in the Series.

NASCAR Camping World Truck Series

Starting in 1995, the NASCAR Truck Series is the third highest ranking stock car series in the United States. The series was the brainchild of then-NASCAR West Coast executive Ken Clapp, who was inspired by off-road truck racing. Unlike the other two national touring NASCAR series, the Truck Series race pickup truck styled bodies, though it is still considered a stock car series because of its similarity. Much like the Xfinity Series, the Truck Series often features Cup Series drivers competing for parts of the season.

ARCA
The Automobile Racing Club of America was founded in 1953 as a Midwest regional series. In addition to the ARCA Menards Series, it also sanctions the ARCA Midwest Tour since 2007, and previously the ARCA Lincoln Welders Truck Series from 1999 to 2016.

NASCAR purchased ARCA in early 2018. For the 2020 season, the NASCAR K&N Series East and West were rebranded under the ARCA banner as the ARCA Menards Series East and ARCA Menards Series West.

Other series
Outside of NASCAR, there are a number of other national or regional stock-car sanctioning bodies in the United States.  There are a few organizations that cater to these local short tracks.  The American Speed Association (ASA), Champion Racing Association (CRA), International Motor Contest Association (IMCA), United Auto Racing Association (UARA), Championship Auto Racing Series (CARS), and the all sanction their own forms of stock-car racing, on varying types of track, and with various levels of media coverage.  The International Race of Champions (IROC) and Superstar Racing Experience (SRX) are usually perceived as being outside of the regular stock car racing scene because of their all-star grids.

New Zealand

Stock car racing began in New Zealand during the 1950s, first race was at Aranui Speedway on November 27, 1954. It was brought to New Zealand after New Zealand Speedway riders witnessed the huge crowds that watched the races in Britain earlier that year. As with the UK, Stock car racing in New Zealand is a very different form of racing than that of the US. Stock car racing is a full-contact sport in New Zealand: as the rule book states, "contact is not only permitted, it is encouraged".
Cars are built to an extremely rigid design and feature strong steel guards around almost the entire car. "Stockcars" are divided into three classes: Superstocks, Stock cars, Ministocks (Ministocks predominantly being a non-contact youth class).
The majority of races are of an individual nature however, unique to New Zealand stock car racing is the team racing format. Typically teams racing consists of two teams of four cars each that work together to win the race. Teams normally protect their "runners" while attempting to eliminate the opposing team, the races can be decided by a points format or first across the finish line.

The class most resembling the North American form of stock car racing are known as Saloon cars.

Australia

Stock car racing in the NASCAR mould (AUSCAR) had a following in Australia during the mid-late 1980s and through the 1990s, but with the advent of the Supercars Championship, which took up the bulk of the competitors, sponsorship dollars on offer as well as major television time, the Australian Superspeedway series shut down after 2001.

The majority of the NASCAR and AUSCAR racing in Australia took place at the 1.801 km (1.119 mi), high-banked (24°) Calder Park Thunderdome in Melbourne. The Thunderdome, which was opened in 1987 and was built by multi-millionaire tyre retailer Bob Jane at a cost of A$54 million, was modeled on a scaled down version of the famous Charlotte Motor Speedway. Other tracks used included the  mile (805 metre) Speedway Super Bowl at the Adelaide International Raceway (also owned by Jane, this was the only paved oval track in Australia other than the Thunderdome, though with only 7° banking in the turns it was more of a traditional flat track), as well as road courses such as the Surfers Paradise Street Circuit (where the cars ran as a support category to the Gold Coast IndyCar Grand Prix), Oran Park in Sydney, and the famous Mount Panorama Circuit.

United Kingdom

Stock, in the sense of cars appearing to be similar to conventional road vehicles, is represented in the UK (and Europe) by touring cars.

The term 'stock cars' in the UK refers to a specialized form of racing that bears little resemblance to any road car.

Stock car racing was brought to Britain in 1954. Taking place on existing greyhound or speedway tracks, the cars were mostly 'stock' cars from the 1930s with locked rear axle differentials and added armour. After the first couple of years 'specials' began to appear eventually making the 'stock' car name something of a misnomer. Since the early days of stock car racing in Britain the sport has developed into many different classes, from the destructive 'Banger' categories to the very sophisticated National Hot Rods. However, the name 'stock car' is usually reserved for that racing class which traces its roots back to these early days in the 1950s, BriSCA F1 Stock Cars, which were previously known as "The Seniors" or "Senior Stock Cars".  Despite the physical demands of this full-contact sport, many competitors have been racing for 20 and even 30 years.  For the first 10 years of the sport, stock cars were either adapted from road cars, or bore the recognizable bodywork of road cars. By the 1970s, chassis and bodywork had evolved into very specialized forms.

In 2001 the ASCAR Racing Series was formed and ran until 2008, the series was a "NASCAR" style racing series that was predominantly ran at Rockingham Motor Speedway as well as briefly on the continent. The first season was won by John Mickel. Other notable champions were Nicolas Minassian and Ben Collins who also played as The Stig on Top Gear. The field was usually populated by professional or semi-professional stock car drivers, however notable drivers who were famous from other areas of motorsport either took part in single races or for one complete season, they included Colin McRae, Jason Plato, Matt Neal, Darren Manning, Max Papis, John Cleland and former NASCAR drivers Brandon Whitt and Randy Tolsma.

The modern BriSCA Formula 1 Stock Cars are a highly sophisticated purpose built race car with race-tuned V-8 engines developing , quick change axles and gearboxes and biased and staggered chassis and braking set up for constant left turning. However large bumpers were mandatory with contact very much encouraged to remove opponents. The sport can be seen at venues throughout Britain and Mainland Europe. A downsized version of the BriSCA Formula 1 Stock Cars, the smaller BriSCA Formula 2 Stock Cars, previously known as "The Juniors" or "Junior Stock Cars", are also very popular. these cars are powered by the 2 litre Ford 'Pinto' engine. There are also many other formulas running on the oval tracks throughout a season that starts around March/Easter and continues to October/November.

In the 2008 World Final, held at Ipswich, Andy Smith raced to victory becoming the 2008 BriSCA F1 Stock Car World Champion for the second time in his career, taking the crown from brother Stuart Smith Jnr. 2009 also saw Andy Smith win again this time at Kings Lynns Norfolk Arena. 2010 saw Andy Smith win for a 3rd consecutive time at Coventry, the same venue as his 1st win in 2006. The 2011 World Championship took place at Northampton on September 10 with 2 Paul Harrison the winner of the Gold Roof. The 2012 World Championship held at Skegness was won by 217 Lee Fairhurst. The 2013 World Championship will be held at King's Lynn on Saturday 21 September.

In 2008, Ian Thompson Jr. became the first driver from Northern Ireland to win the Brisca F2 Stock Car World title since 1972 when he took the honours at Bristol in 2008. However, it was in controversial circumstances after first across the line Gordon Moodie (Thomson Jr's brother-in-law) was disqualified from the race after being found with carburetor irregularities at post race scrutineering. This irregularity has since been proven to be a manufacturing fault with the control of the driver but the governing body have refused to reinstate Gordon Moodie as the winner in the record books. In 2009 the World Championship winner was Micky Brennan and in 2010 the World Championship winner was John Fortune. The 2011 World Championship Final took place at Kings Lynns Norfolk Arena on Saturday 17 September with 871 Mark Simpson winner of the Gold Roof. In 2012, the World Championship was won again by 968 Micky Brennan this time held at Barford. The 2013 World Championship weekend will be held over 2 days of racing on 14/15 September at Smeatharpe near Honiton in Devon.

Another open wheeled stock car formula that races in the UK are Spedeworth Superstox. Licensed by Spedeworth, as opposed to BriSCA, Superstox are similar to Formula Two Stock Cars with the main visual difference being a smaller wing on the roof. These cars are also powered by the 2 litre Ford 'Pinto' engine. The 2010 World Championship Final held at Ipswich was won by Colin Aylward. The 2011 World Championship Final was held at Londons Wimbledon Stadium on Sunday 23 October and won by 151 Nick Smith. The 2012 World Championship was again held at Ipswich and won by Scot 177 Stuart Gilchrist. The 2013 World Championship will be held at Lochgelly in Fife, Scotland, with the date tbc.

Another form of UK stock car racing is Saloon Stock Cars, regulated by the Saloon Stock Car Association. This formula is based on heavily armoured Ford Sierra, Ford Mondeo, Vauxhall Vectra cars purposely reconstructed for this full-contact class. The 2011 World Championship was held at Skegness in August with 677 Eddie Darby the winner of the Gold Roof for the next 12 months. The 2012 World Championship Final was held at Smeatharpe Raceway near Honiton in Devon in August 2012 and again won by 677 Eddie Darby. Other similar Stock Car classes are the 2 Litre Stock Cars licensed by Spedeworth and the 1300 Stock Cars licensed by several different promoters each to slightly differing rules although steps are currently being taken to standardise the specifications in order to make it a national class. The 2012 World Championship was won by 79 Barry Radcliffe at Ipswich. The 2013 World Championship will be held at King's Lynn on Saturday 17 August.

Canada

Stock Car Racing has existed in Canada as early as the 1950s in amateur format, although official structured competitions began with the introduction of the CASCAR league in 1981. The league went on for a few decades until 2006, when it was replaced with the NASCAR Pinty's Series of racing. Vehicle models used are typically from the makes of Chevrolet, Dodge, and Ford. The tracks generally feature a wide variety of types, from ovals to other shapes not commonly found in the official American NASCAR league. The competition has had a growing interest in the recent decades.

Other regions

Internationally, stock car racing has not enjoyed the same success as within the United States and Canada. Brazil also has a successful stock car racing series, with starting grids of 30 or more cars, and two brands competing: Chevrolet and Toyota.  Brazilian Stock Car also has two developing series. Despite the name, Brazilian stock car competitions are not held on oval tracks, thus they resemble more touring car racing than stock car racing the same can be said about Argentina's popular stock series, called Turismo Carretera.
Unsuccessful efforts have been made in Australia, South Africa, and Japan as well.

Career paths
NASCAR drivers take various paths to the highest stock car divisions. Some start racing on dirt surfaces but all end up racing on asphalt surfaces as they progress in their career. They frequently start in karting or in cars that are completely stock except for safety modifications. They generally advance through intermediate or advanced local-level divisions. The highest local division, asphalt late model racing, is generally considered a requirement to advance to the next step, regional and national touring series.

Dirt track drivers follow the same general path. Their highest divisions are less well-known national touring late model series such as the World of Outlaws Late Model Series and regional touring series.

Crossover drivers
Some drivers have entered stock car racing after starting on a very different career path.  The most famous might well be Mario Andretti, who is the only driver ever to win the Indianapolis 500 (1969), NASCAR's Daytona 500 (1967), and the Formula One World Championship (1978). Juan Pablo Montoya is the only other driver with wins in all three series, with two Indy 500 wins (2000 and 2015), seven Formula One wins and two Sprint Cup wins (2007 and 2010). A. J. Foyt, with four Indianapolis 500 wins, seven IndyCar championships, and a victory in the 24 Hours of Le Mans on his resume, also won the Daytona 500 in 1972. Johnny Rutherford, a three-time winner at Indy, has the rare distinction of winning his first NASCAR start, a qualifying race for the 1963 Daytona 500. Dan Gurney, a leading 1960s Formula One driver and later one of the most successful constructors of Indy cars (as well as being Foyt's co-driver at Le Mans), excelled in NASCAR's road-course events, winning at Riverside five times between 1963 and 1968.  A notable crossover oddity is the one-race NASCAR career of the colorful Formula One and sports car driver Innes Ireland: after retiring at the end of the 1966 season, he was invited by NASCAR czar Bill France to compete at Daytona, where he was running in the top ten when his engine blew on the 126th of 200 laps.

Montoya initially surprised the auto racing community by leaving F1, but he was quickly followed by other drivers.  Open wheel stars like Sam Hornish Jr., Patrick Carpentier, Dario Franchitti, Jacques Villeneuve, A. J. Allmendinger and Danica Patrick all made the move to the Monster Energy Cup series, with varying degrees of success. Two-time Australian Supercars champion Marcos Ambrose competed in the Monster Energy Cup Series from 2007 to 2014, winning two races.

Other drivers compete often in stock car racing but are well known for their success elsewhere. Ron Fellows and Boris Said are champion road racers and are often brought in by teams solely to compete in NASCAR's road course events, a title known as road course ringers. Robby Gordon was one of NASCAR's few remaining owner-drivers, but he is most famous for his numerous off-road championships and his three Baja 1000 wins.

Tracks
Stock car races take place predominantly on oval tracks of 3 or 4 turns, with all turns to the left. Oval tracks are classified as short track (less than 1 mile), intermediate or speedway (1 to 2 miles) or superspeedway (over 2 miles). Road courses are any tracks having both left and right turns. In 1987 Bill Elliott's  qualifying time at Talladega brought about a change at superspeedways (Daytona and Talladega). Such high speeds and Bobby Allison's car going airborne into the catch-fence and injuring fans forced NASCAR to implement power-reducing measures, one of which was the mandated implement of below carburetor restrictor plates. This later became known as restrictor plate racing.

Oval circuits differ from the rough terrain and sharp turns of Rally, and the complicated twists and turns of Formula One tracks that put up to 5 or 6 g of horizontal stress on the driver's body. Stock cars are much heavier than Formula One cars, and as a result they are generally slower. Additionally, they cannot produce the g-forces of an open wheel car. A stock car's weak handling with high power output places more emphasis on car control.

Tactics

In contrast with most forms of racing, minor car-to-car contact is generally accepted in stock car racing.  This may happen in the form of forcing another vehicle out of the way, or pushing a competing vehicle forward for mutual benefit. Stock cars are generally built to be tolerant of superficial damage to bodywork, whereas open wheel designs can experience severe reductions in performance with even slight spoiler damage. On intermediate tracks and superspeedways, drafting is used to reduce the overall effect of drag. A driver accomplishes this by positioning the vehicle close to the one ahead of so as to benefit from the other's slipstream. Drafting was "discovered" by Junior Johnson during his winning performance at the 1960 Daytona 500.

See also

 British Stock Car Association
 British Stock car racing
 CASCAR Super Series 1981–2006
 Desafio Corona 2004–07; now NASCAR Mexico Series
 Hot rod
 Hot Rods (oval racing)
 OSCAAR
 Production car racing
 Speedcar Series

References

External links
 NASCAR

American culture
 
Sports originating in the United States
Symbols of North Carolina